PCSA may stand for:
 primary census statistical area, in the United States census
 physiological cross sectional area of a pennate muscle
 primary care service area, geographic areas that are self-sufficient markets of primary care medicine
 Presbyterian Church of Southern Africa